Royal Comics Syndicate is a Finnish comics syndicate that was founded in 2004 by comic artist Timo Kähkönen. The syndicate's ongoing goal is to internationalize domestic comics by operating as an agent for comic artists and selling the publishing rights to newspapers, magazines, and other media, on their behalf. Kähkönen's most famous comic is Paikallisuutisia (Local News).

Comics
Royal is currently distributing six comics series. All of them are being published in Finland. As of 2011, Local News is also being published in Norway and Dark Side of the Horse on the GoComics and Yahoo! News websites.

 Paikallisuutisia (Local News)
 Kapine (Tin-Bin)
 Loikan vuoksi (Urban Leap)
 Musta hevonen (Dark Side of the Horse)
 Sekametsä (Mixed Forest)
 Viljo ja Esteri (Bill and Esther)

External links 
 
 Scientific Research on Internationalizing Domestic Comics - About Royal Comics Syndicate, on pages 22, 23, and 43.
 Royal Comics Syndicate on Ylioppilaslehti maganize - An article covering the significance of the syndicate and about its expansion to abroads.
 Ministry of Education focuses on comics and fashion in cultural export efforts

2004 establishments in Finland
Comic book publishing companies of Finland
Comic strip syndicates